Richard Leppla (9 June 1914 – 4 August 1988) was a German fighter ace in the Luftwaffe during World War II. He was a recipient of the Knight's Cross of the Iron Cross. Leppla claimed 68 aerial victories claimed in over 500 combat missions. The Knight's Cross of the Iron Cross was awarded to recognise extreme battlefield bravery or successful military leadership.

Career
Leppla was born on 9 June 1914 in Matzenbach, joining the army as a cadet in 1934, he transferred to the Luftwaffe in 1935 and was an Oberleutnant with 3 Staffel, Jagdgeschwader 51 (JG 51—51st fighter wing) when the war started.

Leppla was Staffelkapitän (squadron leader) by March 1940, and claimed his first confirmed victory on 10 May, a Dutch Fokker G.I. By July he had claimed five victories, and during the Battle of Britain Hauptmann Leppla claimed eight more and was appointed Gruppenkommandeur (group commander) of III./JG 51.

Leppla then took part in Operation Barbarossa, the invasion of the Soviet Union. On 12 July, he was credited with claiming JG 51s 1,200 aerial victory. Raising his score further, he was awarded the Knight's Cross of the Iron Cross on 27 July 1941 after downing 27 aircraft.

His 40th victim fell 10 October 1941 and his 50th came on 9 February 1942.
Leppla was severely wounded in August 1942, losing the vision in one eye after colliding with a landing Junkers Ju 52.

After a period of hospitalisation in December 1942 Leppla was assigned to command Jagdfliegerschule 5 (later renamed JG 105), a position he held until August 1943.

In April 1945 Leppla was then appointed Geschwaderkommodore of Jagdgeschwader 6. When the war ended, Leppla was interned by Soviet forces, remaining in captivity until 1950.

He then served in the West German Air Force, reaching the rank of Oberst before retiring from active service in 1972.

Leppla flew over 500 combat missions and claimed 68 victories (13 on the western front and the 55 on the Russian front). 

Richard Leppla died of natural causes in his hometown on 4 August 1988, when he was 74 years old.

Awards 
 Iron Cross (1939) 2nd and 1st Class
 German Cross in Gold on 9 December 1941 as Hauptmann in the III./Jagdgeschwader 51
 Knight's Cross of the Iron Cross on 27 July 1941 as Hauptmann and Gruppenkommandeur of the III./Jagdgeschwader 51

References

Citations

Bibliography

 
 
 
 
 
 
 

1914 births
1988 deaths
Luftwaffe pilots
German World War II flying aces
Recipients of the Gold German Cross
Recipients of the Knight's Cross of the Iron Cross
German prisoners of war in World War II held by the Soviet Union
Military personnel from Rhineland-Palatinate
People from Kusel (district)